Salt Gap is an unincorporated community in McCulloch County, Texas, United States. Salt Gap is located at the junction of Farm to Market Road 503 and Farm to Market Road 504 in western McCulloch County. The community had a post office from 1905 to 1913 and from 1924 to after 1930. Its population was 25 as of 2000.

References

Unincorporated communities in McCulloch County, Texas
Unincorporated communities in Texas